United States gubernatorial elections are scheduled to be held on November 4, 2025, in two states, New Jersey and Virginia. These elections form part of the 2025 United States elections. The last gubernatorial elections for New Jersey and Virginia were in 2021. Both incumbents are in-eligible to run for re-election due to term limits. More states may hold elections due to a gubernatorial vacancy (depending on a state's constitution) or recall of a governor.

Race summary

New Jersey 

Governor Phil Murphy was re-elected to a second term in 2021 with 51.2% of the vote. He will be term-limited by the New Jersey Constitution in 2025 and cannot seek re-election for a third consecutive term. Democratic former state senator Stephen Sweeney, as well as Republican former state assemblyman Jack Ciattarelli, who was the 2021 gubernatorial nominee, are running.

Virginia

Governor Glenn Youngkin was elected in 2021 with 50.6% of the vote. He will be term-limited by the Virginia Constitution in 2025 and cannot seek re-election for a second consecutive term. Lieutenant Governor Winsome Sears has been mentioned as a potential Republican gubernatorial candidate. Former Democratic Governor Ralph Northam is eligible to run for re-election for a second non-consecutive term, but has not publicly said that he would do so.

References 

 
November 2025 events in the United States